is a city located in Osaka Prefecture, Japan.

Geography

The northwestern part of the city is relatively flat, but the terrain rises to the east where the Ikoma Mountains and Mount Kongō form the border with Nara Prefecture.

Neighboring municipalities
Osaka Prefecture
Yao
Fujiidera
Habikino
Nara Prefecture
Kashiba
Ōji
Sangō

Climate
Kashiwara has a Humid subtropical climate (Köppen Cfa) characterized by warm summers and cool winters with light to no snowfall.

Demographics
Per Japanese census data, the population of Kashiwara has increased steadily until around the year 2000, and has since started to decline.

History
The area of the modern city of Kashiwara was within ancient Kawachi Province. Remains dating back to the Japanese Paleolithic have been found, indicating many thousands of years of continuous settlement. During the Kofun period, many burial mounds were built in Kashihara due to its location on the Yamato River connecting the Yamato Basin with the coast. During the Nara period, the Kawachi kokubunji was built. During the Edo Period, the area was mostly tenryō territory directly under control of the Tokugawa shogunate due to its strategic location.  The village of Kashihara was established within Shiki District with the creation of the modern municipalities system on April 1, 1889.  On April 1, 1896, the area became part of Minamikawachi District, Osaka. Kashiwara was promoted to town status on January 1, 1915. Kashiwara Town absorbed Katashimo Town and Katakami Village in 1939 and its district was changed to Nakakawachi District.  The large area of Kokubu Town merged with Kashiwara Town in 1956. In 1958, Kashiwara was elevated to city status.

Government
Kashiwara has a mayor-council form of government with a directly elected mayor and a unicameral city council of 16 members. Kashiwara contributes one member to the Osaka Prefectural Assembly. In terms of national politics, the city is part of Osaka 14th district of the lower house of the Diet of Japan.

Economy
Kashiwara was traditionally known for its dyeing industry, notably for use in yukata robes, most much of this industry has been lost to overseas competition. In terms of agriculture, the area is note for production of grapes. The modern economy is centered on light manufacturing and the city is also increasingly becoming a commuter town for the Osaka metropolis.

Education
Kashiwara has ten public elementary schools and seven public middle schools operated by the city government. The city does not have a public high school, but there are two private high schools. Universities include the Osaka Kyoiku University, Kansai University of Welfare Sciences, and Kansai Women's College.

Transportation

Railway
 JR West – Yamatoji Line
 -  -  
 Kintetsu Railway -    Kintetsu Osaka Line
  -  -  -

Highway
  Nishi-Meihan Expressway

Sister city relations 
  Xinxiang, Henan, China
  Grosseto and Province of Grosseto, Italy

Local attractions 
Takaida Cave Tombs, National Historic Site

Notable people from Kashiwara 
 Masahiro Doi, baseball player
 Tomoyuki Tanaka, film producer

Notes

External links

 Kashiwara City official website 
 Kashiwara City official website 

Cities in Osaka Prefecture